Microsoft Visual Programming Language, or VPL, is a visual programming and dataflow programming language developed by Microsoft for the Microsoft Robotics Studio. 
VPL is based on the event-driven and data-driven approach. The programming language is distinguished from other Microsoft programming languages such as Visual Basic and C#, as it is the only Microsoft language that is a true visual programming language.  Microsoft has utilized the term "Visual" in its previous programming products to reflect that a large degree of development in these languages can be performed by "dragging and dropping" in a traditional wysiwyg fashion.

See also
 Dataflow programming
 Visual programming languages
 Microsoft Robotics Developer Studio
 VIPLE: Visual IoT/Robotics Programming Language Environment

References

Further reading

External links
 Microsoft Visual Programming Language
 Visual IoT/Robotics Programming Language Environment: 
 Andreas Ulbrich demonstrates the Microsoft Visual Programming Language

Microsoft development tools
Visual Programming Language
Robot programming languages
Visual programming languages